Michael Haydn's Symphony No. 34 in E-flat major, Perger 26, Sherman 34, MH 473, written in Salzburg in 1788, is the last E-flat major symphony he wrote, the first of his final set of six symphonies.

Scored for 2 oboes, 2 bassoons, 2 horns and strings, in three movements:

Allegro con brio
Adagietto, in B-flat major
Fugato. Allegro

The first and last movements begin the same way, only that the first movement uses the theme to launch a sonata form while the third movement uses it to preface a fugato.

Discography

Like the other symphonies of the 1788 set of six, this one is in the CPO disc with Johannes Goritzki conducting the New German Chamber Academy. It is also available on a Chandos disc of the London Mozart Players conducted by Matthias Bamert, which also includes Symphonies Nos. 11, 16 and 25.

References
 A. Delarte, "A Quick Overview Of The Instrumental Music Of Michael Haydn" Bob's Poetry Magazine November 2006: 28 - 29 PDF
 Charles H. Sherman and T. Donley Thomas, Johann Michael Haydn (1737 - 1806), a chronological thematic catalogue of his works. Stuyvesant, New York: Pendragon Press (1993)
 C. Sherman, "Johann Michael Haydn" in The Symphony: Salzburg, Part 2 London: Garland Publishing (1982): lxviii

Symphony 34
1788 compositions
Compositions in E-flat major